This is a list of affinity, specialized, and local bar associations in the state of Oregon.  Unlike the Oregon State Bar Association, membership in these associations is voluntary.

Affinity bar associations 
 Lane County Women Lawyers
 Northwest Indian Bar Association (NIBA)
 Oregon Attorneys with Disability Association (OADA)
 Oregon Asian Pacific American Bar Association (OAPABA)
 Oregon Chinese Lawyers Association (OCLA)
 Oregon Chapter of the Federal Bar Association (Oregon FBA)
 Oregon Filipino American Lawyers Association (OFALA)
 Oregon Hispanic Bar Association (OHBA)
 Oregon LGBTQ Bar Association (OGALLA)
 Oregon Minority Lawyers Association (OMLA)
 Oregon Muslim Bar Association (OMBA)
 Oregon Chapter of the National Bar Association (OC-NBA)
 Oregon Women Lawyers (OWLS)
 Portland National Lawyers Guild (Portland NLG)
 Puntland Women Lawyers Association (PUWLA)
 South Asian Bar Association - Oregon Chapter (SABA - Oregon)

Specialty bar associations 
  Oregon Association of Defense Counsel (OADC)
  Oregon Criminal Defense Lawyers Association (OCDLA)
  Oregon District Attorneys Association (ODAA)
  Oregon Chapter of the Federal Bar Association (Oregon FBA)
  Oregon Chapter of the American Immigration Lawyers Association (Oregon AILA)
  Oregon Trial Lawyers Association (OTLA)

County bar associations 
 Baker County Bar Association
 Benton-Linn County Bar Association
 Clackamas County Bar Association
 Clatsop County Bar Association
 Columbia County Bar Association
 Coos County Bar Association
 Crook-Jefferson Counties Bar Association
 Curry County Bar Association
 Deschutes County Bar Association
 Douglas County Bar Association
 Jackson County Bar Association
 Josephine County Bar Association
 Klamath County Bar Association
 Lake County Bar Association
 Lane County Bar Association
 Lincoln County Bar Association
 Linn-Benton Bar Association
 Marion County Bar Association
 Malheur County Bar Association
 Mid-Columbia County Bar Association
 Multnomah Bar Association
 Polk County Bar Association
 Tillamook County Bar Association
 Union County Bar Association
 Wallowa County Bar Association
 Wasco County Bar Association
 Washington County Bar Association
 Yamhill County Bar Association

Judicial district bar associations 
 Sixth Judicial District Bar Association (Umatilla and Morrow counties)
 Twenty-Fourth Judicial District Bar Association (Grant and Harney counties)

Oregon
Oregon
affinity